Celine Holst Elkjær (born 25 May 1997) is a Danish handball player who currently plays for HH Elite.

Achievements 
Danish Cup
Bronze Medalist: 2017

References

1997 births
Living people
People from Skanderborg Municipality
Danish female handball players
Sportspeople from the Central Denmark Region